Meiacanthus geminatus is a species of combtooth blenny found in the western central Pacific Ocean where it is known from Darvel Bay, Borneo and Palawan, Philippines.  This species grows to a length of  SL.

References

External links

  Includes photograph and radiograph of species holotype.

geminatus
Fish described in 1976